Club Deportivo Enersur is a Peruvian football club, playing in the city of Ilo, Moquegua, Peru.

History
The club Deportivo Enersur was founded the February 1, 2003. 

In 2003 Copa Perú the club classified to the National Stage but was eliminated by the Deportivo Educación. 

In 2004 Copa Perú, 2006 Copa Perú and 2009 Copa Perú, the club was the departamental champion of Moquegua, but was eliminated in the Regional Stage.

Honours

Regional
Región VIII:
Winners (1): 2003

Liga Departamental de Moquegua:
Winners (6): 2003, 2004, 2006, 2009, 2015, 2016
 Runner-up (1): 2014

Liga Provincial de Ilo:
Winners (4): 2003, 2009, 2013, 2015
 Runner-up (4): 2004, 2011, 2014, 2016

Liga Distrital de Ilo:
Winners (4): 2003, 2006, 2011, 2015
 Runner-up (1): 2009, 2013, 2014, 2016, 2017, 2018

See also
List of football clubs in Peru
Peruvian football league system

External links
 Enersur de aniversario
 Enersur - Miller, de alta tensión

Football clubs in Peru
Association football clubs established in 2003